Charlotte Lembach (born 1 April 1988) is a French right-handed sabre fencer, 2018 team world champion, two-time Olympian, and 2021 team Olympic silver medalist.

Lembach competed in the 2016 Rio de Janeiro Olympic Games and the 2020 Tokyo Olympic Games.

Career
Lembach was first called into the French national team for the 2009 European Championships in Plovdiv, but a hamstring injury prevented her from attending the competition. She was selected again for the 2012 European Championships in Kiev, but did not manage to earn a qualification for the 2012 Summer Olympics in London.

After the Games, three members of the French team retired, leaving Lembach as team elder: at the age of 24 she acquired the nickname “Mamie” (“Granny”). The 2012–13 season saw her breakthrough: at Tianjin she climbed on the podium of a World Cup event, which no other French sportswomen had accomplished in two years and a half. She however failed to earn a medal in the 2013 European Championships and the 2013 World Championships.

In the 2013–14 season Jean-Philippe Daurelle replaced Cyril Tahon as coach of the French women's sabre team, which Lembach described as “a breath of fresh air”. Under his coaching Lembach won a silver medal in the Dakar World Cup and climbed on the podium in Chicago and Beijing. In the European Championships held in her native Strasbourg, Lembach defeated teammate Cécilia Berder, but failed in the second round against No.1 seed Vassiliki Vougiouka and finished 13th. In the team event, France defeated Germany, but were overcome in the semi-finals by reigning champions Russia. They prevailed over Poland to come away with a bronze medal. In the World Championships at Kazan, she fell in the second round again, this time at the hands of Małgorzata Kozaczuk of Poland. In the team event France defeated Hungary, then created an upset by beating Russia in the quarter-finals and Italy in the semi-finals. Their winning streak was snapped in the final by the United States led by twice-Olympic champion Mariel Zagunis and France came away with a silver medal.

Lembach is a student at EDHEC Business School.

Medal Record

Olympic Games

World Championship

European Championship

Grand Prix

World Cup

References

External links

Profile at the European Fencing Confederation

1988 births
Living people
French female sabre fencers
Sportspeople from Strasbourg
Fencers at the 2016 Summer Olympics
Olympic fencers of France
Alsatian people
Fencers at the 2020 Summer Olympics
Olympic silver medalists for France
Olympic medalists in fencing
Medalists at the 2020 Summer Olympics
Mediterranean Games competitors for France
Competitors at the 2022 Mediterranean Games
21st-century French women